The LG Cup Four Nations is an exhibition association football tournament that took place in Iran.

Participants
The participants were:

Venues

Results

Semifinals

Third place match

Final

References

International association football competitions hosted by Iran